The Saint Dominic Cathedral, commonly referred to as the Bayombong Cathedral, is an 18th-century, Baroque church located at Brgy. Salvacion, Bayombong, Nueva Vizcaya, Philippines. The cathedral, which is the seat of the Roman Catholic Diocese of Bayombong, is under the patronage of Saint Dominic.

Saint Dominic Cathedral of Bayombong, Nueva Vizcaya, Philippines was founded in 1739 by the Augustinian Friars of Spain.

Church history
It was April 12, 1739 when the first Eucharistic Celebration was held there with Fray Pedro Freire presiding. During these days in the 18th century, this cathedral was still called The Church of St. Augustine. It won’t be until a few months later, on September 8, that it will be dedicated to St. Dominic De Guzman.

The mission in present-day Bayombong had its roots in the mid-18th century when it was formally accepted by the Dominicans as mission center in a region previously referred to as Paniqui. Soon after founding the mission, the erection of the church structure took place in 1780 under the supervision of Father Juan Crespo, OP. According to records, the church, and other nearby structures, was gutted by fire in 1892. Father Cerefino Martinez, O.P. initiated the reconstruction of the church. It was completed three years after, in 1895, with the installation of galvanized iron roofing, new altarpieces and a new pulpit.

Architecture
The church façade is described as a close copy of that of the San Vicente Ferrer Church in Dupax del Sur and the Santa Catalina de Siena Church in Bambang, Nueva Vizcaya, with its doors, windows and oculus, not to mention the pediment shape that’s also similar to that of the older  Tuguegarao Cathedral in Cagayan province. A difference, however between this church and the two above-mentioned churches is the lack of columns framing the windows. The slightly-detached, octagonal campanile is also distinct to the church of Bayombong. The façade, with its squat appearance, is divided into four sections by cornices. The façade is ornamented with two windows on the second level (flanking a saint’s niche) and an oculus on the third level.

References

External links

Roman Catholic churches in Nueva Vizcaya
Roman Catholic cathedrals in the Philippines
Roman Catholic churches completed in 1780
18th-century Roman Catholic church buildings in the Philippines
Spanish Colonial architecture in the Philippines
Baroque architecture in the Philippines